The 50th Anniversary World Tour (or sometimes called Return to Forever Tour) was a worldwide tour by German rock band Scorpions. It started on 1 May 2015 in Zhenjiang and finished in Berlin on 2 December 2016. It was in the support of band's eighteenth studio album Return to Forever and it was also celebration of band's fifty years in music business. Tour was ranked by Pollstar at No. 79 at their "Top 100 Worldwide Tour" chart for 2015 with total gross of $22,400,000 and total of 375.576 tickets sold from 51 concerts. It was also ranged by Pollstar at No. 68 at their "Top 100 Worldwide Tour" chart for 2016 with total gross of $26,200,000 and total of 383,398 tickets sold from 59 concerts. It was, also, the last Scorpions worldwide tour to feature James Kottak and first worldwide tour to feature Mikkey Dee as a band's official drummer.

Background
In 2010 Scorpions announced farewell tour. Before they retire, they wanted to release a bonus track album from leftovers from seventies and eighties just for the fans. After playing the final show in Munich in December 2012, band planned to take a break and go on vacation. In January 2013, MTV contacted the band and asked if they are interested in doing the MTV Unplugged album. They agreed on doing that project and turned out to be successful. That whole thing pushed back the bonus track project. As soon as they have finished the MTV Unplugged project, band immediately went back to studio to work on bonus track project. Band was listening the recordings they have already prepared for the project. They were happy with the result and Rudolf Schenker said that he has a tape with some songs that they could also use for this project. While searching for the tape, Schenker found an old ledger in which his mother enumerated the loans that his father provided to him, so he could buy all the equipment and establish the band. He looked into the book and it said: "September, 1965". He went back to the studio and told the band what he found and their manager said that it would be great idea to celebrate 50th Anniversary since they are the only German band who is 50 years in music and one of the few in the world along with The Rolling Stones, The Who, Beach Boys and Pink Floyd. Manager suggested to the band that they contact the promoters and see if they were interested in the band doing the 50th Anniversary Tour. Then Schenker suggested that if the band was going to do a 50th Anniversary Tour, then the band needed to release a brand new studio album. So the band went again into the listening process of bonus track material that they had already prepared and see if they could improve something, like choruses and riffs. After that, they re-recorded the old stuff and started to write new songs with the producers Mikael Nord Andersson and Martin Hansen. The result was the album Return to Forever.

On 16 August 2014 Scorpions released through their social media a promotional picture with which they announced 50th Anniversary Tour and new studio album for 2015. On 18 December 2014, band announced 2015 spring and summer European tour dates as well as German tour dates for the March 2016. North American dates for September and October 2016 with special quest Queensrÿche were announced on 16 June 2015, on very same day when were released North American release dates for the album Return to Forever (2015) and first single "We Built This House". On 1 May 2015, band performed on Changjiang International Music Festival in front of 100,000 people, making this their first performance in China in their career. Between 13 and 21 May 2016, Scorpions have performed their first time ever concert residency at The Joint in Las Vegas. Originally, the band received an offer to do a full month residency concert, but it didn't work out for various reasons, so the band was only able to perform five shows. On 18 October 2016, Scorpions performed in Palais Theatre in Melbourne, Australia, marking their first concert in Australia in their career. A concert in Bangkok scheduled for 26 October 2016 was cancelled because of the death of king Bhumibol Adulyadej.

Stage and performances
Show set was designed by Günter Jäckle and Rainer Becker designed lighting. Manfred Nikitser, associated lighting designer and director also joined production team. Nikitser chose two GrandMA2 full-size desks, one grandMA2 light, 2 MA VPU plus MK2 video processing units, 2 MA NPU network processing units and 2 MA network switches. The lights used consist of 36 Clay Paky A.leda B-EYE K20s, 8 Sharpy Wash 330s, 10 Mythos units and 20 Stormy CCs. Stage design also consists of a big L.E.D. back screen, a set screen, and two IMAG screens. The set also has four crossbars and ladders. Stage also features flying platform with drum kit with the Sharpy Wash lights placed underneath. Nikister said that those lights were chosen because those lights are the best from point of compactness, high output and speed. PRG Nocturne provided all the equipment. MANIK Show Lighting and Manfred Nikitser managed the Lighting control console and MA VPUs. The visual content was dealt with by Hans-Otto Richter and Nikitser.

Every show started with a sound of sirens and curtain falling down. After that, band opened show with song "Going Out With a Bang" following with songs "Make It Real" and "The Zoo". During the performance of the song "The Zoo", Meine would tossing his cowbell drumsticks into the crowd. That song was followed by an instrumental "Coast to Coast" which lead to so-called "70's Medley" during which the band performed snippets of the songs "Top of the Bill", "Steamrock Fever", "Speedy's Coming" and "Catch Your Train". Medley was followed by performance of the song "We Built This House" and electric guitar instrumental "Delicate Dance" during which Matthias Jabs plays electric guitar with a guest guitar player,his technician,Ingo Powitzer. "Delicate Dance" was followed with an "Acoustic Medley" during which band plays acoustic versions of the songs "Always Somewhere", "Eye of the Storm" and "Send Me an Angel". That followed with "Wind of Change", "Rock 'n' Roll Band" and "Dynamite". After that James Kottak played his drum solo while his drum platform was risen above the stage. During his performance, pictures of all band's album covers were shown on the screen. When Kottak finished with his drum solo, band would return to stage to play "Blackout" during which Rudolf Schenker played electric guitar with dry ice dispenser. Band finished concert with "No One Like You" and "Big City Nights". After the concert was done, band return to stage to play "Still Loving You" and "Rock You Like a Hurricane". During the concert in Barclays Center In Brooklyn on 12 September 2015, 12-year old guitarist Brandon Niederauer joined the band on stage to play guitar on song "No One Like You".

Live streaming and recordings
Scorpions teamed up with Yahoo! for their first global live streaming. Yahoo! streamed band's live performance on 12 September 2015 at 9:10 p.m. ET from Barclays Center in Brooklyn. Live streaming was available for desktop computers on Yahoo! Screen website and through Yahoo! Screen application for mobile devices with iOS and Android or connected devices (Apple TV, Roku, Xbox). On 22 April 2016, band released version of the album Return to Forever (2015) called Return to Forever: Tour Edition which has seven bonus tracks and two bonus DVD's. Those DVDs include full performances of the band on Barclays Center, full band's performance on Hellfest on 20 June 2015 and documentary called On the Road in America directed by Dennis Dirksen. Filmed in Los Angeles, Santa Barbara and Las Vegas, documentary takes a look at the group's impressive longevity and continued popularity in the United States.

Klaus Meine health issues and departure of James Kottak
On 21 March 2016, 30 minutes into the concert at Barclaycard Arena in Hamburg, Klaus Meine complained about sore throat. Band was forced to stop the concert and Meine went for medical exam. He was diagnosed with advanced viral infection and larynx and trachea inflammation. To get whole health situation under control, Meine went under the medical treatment and doctors banned him to sing for several weeks and because of that, concerts at Lanxess Arena in Cologne, Arena Leipzig in Leipzig, Festhalle in Frankfurt, Mercedes-Benz Arena in Berlin and Barclaycard Arena in Hamburg had to be postponed. Around that time, James Kottak had some personal issues and he went to Eric Claptons's Crossroads Centre in Antigua for one month rehab treatment. While staying there, Kottak decided to stay for two more weeks with a plan to go back on the tour with the band right after the treatment. Band members advised him to take advantage of this treatment and that he stays longer. They said that they will call Mikkey Dee to replace him as a drummer on the upcoming tour dates and Kottak agreed on that. He stayed in Crossroads Centre until end of July 2016 and he stayed there for total of 92 days. Since the next batch of concerts was in South America in September 2016, all the band's sound equipment and instruments were transporting there at that time. Since swapping Dee's drums and equipment with Kottak's would cost between 25,000-$30,000, Kottak and rest of the band agreed that is better for Dee to finish rest of the tour since there were only small number of shows left. Kottak decided to stay at home for a little while and next time when he and band talked, they mutually agreed that it just doesn't make any sense for him to continue playing with the band.

Critical and commercial reception
Seb Male from The Edge said about the band's performance on Ramblin' Man Fair in 2015: " Scorpions were nearly half an hour late on stage, prompting some disappointed fans to head over to watch Camel on the Prog Stage instead, but when they finally did arrive they were definitely on form. Klaus Meine remains pitch-perfect after all these years". Jason MacNeil from Toronto Sun said about the concert in Molson Canadian Amphitheatre on 18 September 2015 that "it seems the band is running on fumes". Mark LePage from Montreal Gazette said about the concert in Bell Centre on 19 September 2015 that "At 67, Meine could easily have passed for a decade younger in both appearance and voice. Hell, the whole band was in fighting trim, from drummer James Kottak to guitarists Matthias Jabs and Rudolf Schenker. Metal makes old bones, and metal rules". Alan Cox from Denver Post said about the concert in Greenwood Village on 29 September 2015 that "It was symbolic of how, despite the many years of playing, the band is still out on the road and still giving their fans what they want–to be rocked like a hurricane". Raymond Ahner from National Rock Review gave positive review about concert SAP Center at San Jose on 1 October 2015 stating that "it was clear that even after fifty years, the Scorpions still know what it takes to deliver a big arena rock show". Cassandra Miasnikov from Santa Barbara Independent praised the show in Santa Barbara Bowl on 6 October 2015 by saying "The Scorpions proved that they deserve every bit of credit they've achieved as one of the most prominent and longest lasting rock bands in the world".

50th Anniversary World Tour was ranked by Pollstar at #79 at their "Top 100 Worldwide Tour" chart for 2015 with total gross of $22,400,000 and total of 375.576 tickets sold from 51 concerts. It was also ranged by Pollstar at #68 at their "Top 100 Worldwide Tour" chart for 2016 with total gross of $26,200,000 and total of 383.398 tickets sold from 59 concerts.

Tour dates

References

2015 concert tours
2016 concert tours
Scorpions (band) concert tours